Take Two or Take 2 may refer to:

Media
 Take-Two Interactive, a video game publisher
 Take Two (The Price Is Right), a segment game on the American TV game show The Price is Right
 The Princess Diaries: Take Two, a book by Meg Cabot
 "Take Two", a 2008 upgrade to the Apple TV digital media receiver
 Take Two (novel), a novel by Julia DeVillers and Jennifer Roy

Film and television
 Take Two, a 1988 film starring Frank Stallone
 Take 2 (film), a 2017 film directed by Ivan Ho
 Take Two (TV series), a 2018 American television series
 Take 2, a defunct sister channel to HBO

Music
 Take Two (Marvin Gaye and Kim Weston album), 1966
 Take Two (EP), an EP by Brad Corrigan (Braddigan)
 Take Two (Robson & Jerome album), 1996
 Take Two, 2001 compilation album by New Riders of the Purple Sage and Poco
 Take Two, a 2010 album by Sezairi Sezali

Other
 Take Two, a variant of the board game Scrabble
 Take 2: The Student's Point of View, an educational organization founded by Karin Muller

See also
 It Takes Two (disambiguation)
 Take (disambiguation)
 Take One (disambiguation)